SKNL PRz PR-5 Wiewiór plus is a Polish unmanned aerial vehicle (UAV) being developed by students of Rzeszów University of Technology (SKNL PRz), beginning in January 2006. Fifth of the series, following PR-1 Szpion, PR-2 Gacek, PR-3, PR-4 (SAE lifter) and PR-5 Wiewiór, it is an experimental reconnaissance aircraft. It has carbon fiber and kevlar monocoque structure with aluminium ferrules. Power plants are two electric brushless three-phase motors.

Rescue System

Different types of parachutes used in PR-5 Wiewiór plus allow to control descent velocity depending on airplane weight and expected windspeed. Two basic types: ring and cruciform parachutes in various sizes are available; all use pilot chute pull-out deployment.

Specifications

General characteristics
 Length: 1.4 m
 Wingspan: 2.14 m
 Height:  0.3 m
 Wing area: 0.53 m²
 Empty: 2.5 kg
 Maximum takeoff: 5.5 kg
 Powerplant: 2x AXI 2820/14
 Airfoil: CLARK Y15
 Endurance: ~50 min

See also 
 List of unmanned aerial vehicles

References

External links
 Project Homepage

V-tail aircraft
Unmanned aerial vehicles of Poland
2000s Polish civil aircraft